IPSN, the IEEE/ACM International Conference on Information Processing in Sensor Networks, is an academic conference on sensor networks with its main focus on information processing aspects of sensor networks. IPSN draws upon many disciplines including signal and image processing, information and coding theory, networking and protocols, distributed algorithms, wireless communications, machine learning, embedded systems design, and data bases and information management.

IPSN Events
IPSN started in 2001, and following is a list of IPSN events from 2001 to 2014:
 13th IPSN 2014, Berlin, Germany, April 15–17, 2014
 12th IPSN 2013, Philadelphia, PA, USA, April 8–11, 2013
 11th IPSN 2012, Beijing, China, April 16–19, 2012
 10th IPSN 2011, Chicago, IL, USA, April 12–14, 2011
 9th IPSN 2010, Stockholm, Sweden, April 12–16, 2010
 8th IPSN 2009, San Francisco, California, USA, April 13–16, 2009
 7th IPSN 2008, (Washington U.) St. Louis, Missouri, USA, April 22–24, 2008
 6th IPSN 2007, (MIT) Cambridge, MA, USA, April 25–27, 2007
 5th IPSN 2006, (Vanderbilt) Nashville, Tennessee, USA, April 19–21, 2006
 4th IPSN 2005, (UCLA) Los Angeles, CA, USA, April 25–27, 2005
 3rd IPSN 2004, (UC Berkeley) Berkeley, CA, USA, April 26–27, 2004
 2nd IPSN 2003, (Xerox PARC) Palo Alto, CA, USA, April 22–23, 2003
 CSP Workshop 2001, (Xerox PARC) Palo Alto, CA (see history subsection for name explanation)

Ranking
Although there is no official ranking of academic conferences on wireless sensor networks,
IPSN is widely regarded by researchers as one of the two (along with SenSys) most prestigious conferences focusing on sensor network research. SenSys focuses more on system issues while IPSN on  algorithmic and theoretical considerations. The acceptance rate for 2006 was 15.2% for oral presentations, 25% overall (25 papers +17 poster presentations, out of 165 submissions accepted).

History
IPSN started off as a workshop at Xerox Palo Alto Research Center in 2001, and it was initially called Collaborative Signal Processing Workshop (CSP Workshop). Following the success of the first event, in 2003, the workshop defined its focus more on sensor networks and was renamed International Workshop on Information Processing in Sensor Networks (IPSN). The event kept the name acronym IPSN from 2003 onwards but the full name changed from International Symposium on Information Processing in Sensor Networks (2003 - 2004) to International Conference on Information Processing in Sensor Networks (2005 - 2007). It is expected that IPSN would keep the full name International Conference on Information Processing in Sensor Networks for the coming years.

SPOTS Track
In 2005 IPSN introduced a separate track on Sensor Platforms, Tools and Design Methods (SPOTS) to the conference. The focus of the IPSN track is more on information processing algorithms, and the focus of SPOTS track is on platform tools and design methods for network embedded sensors.

See also
 Wireless sensor network

External links

IPSN Bibliography (from DBLP)

Wireless sensor network
Computer networking conferences